The 1984 Canadian Professional Championship was a professional non-ranking snooker tournament, which took place in August 1984 in Toronto, Canada.

Cliff Thorburn won the title beating Mario Morra 9–2 in the final.

Main draw

References

Canadian Professional Championship
Canadian Professional Championship
Canadian Professional Championship
Canadian Professional Championship